Tuvalu A-Division or The National Provident Fund Championship League  (NPF) is the top football division in Tuvalu. Eight of the nine islands in Tuvalu are represented in the competition. Niulakita is the only island that has no football club. Some clubs have two teams competing. The competition takes place at the 1,500-capacity Tuvalu Sports Ground in Funafuti, this is the only soccer field in Tuvalu. Because of this all of the clubs are located at the head island but still represent their own eight islands.

The Tuvalu A-division has no relegation rule. The B-Division is the competition for the B teams of each club. The same applies for the C-Division. The competition was founded in 2001.

Taganoa Cup
Within this tournament is another tournament; the Taganoa Cup. It was a gift of Nauti FC from Auckland, New Zealand and started in 2006. The winner defend in every game it is playing the Cup, until they lose it, where the winning team on their turn have to defend it, and this goes on until the end of the NPF League Tournament. The team then holding the Cup at that moment, won't earn a prize, but is carrier of this prestigious title, and will defend it the next year.

Clubs (2021) 

Tofaga were the champions in 2021.

Previous winners

<div style="text-align:left">
Source

Number of titles A-Division

References

External links
RSSSF.com

 
A-Division
Top level football leagues in Oceania
Sports leagues established in 2001
2001 establishments in Tuvalu